The siege of Kaminoyama took place in 1600, at the end of Japan's Sengoku period. It was one of many battles making up the Sekigahara Campaign, in which Tokugawa Ieyasu eliminated the last opposition to his domination of the Japanese islands.

Honmura Chikamori and Yokota Munetoshi, commanders under Naoe Kanetsugu, led 4,000 men against the castle of Kaminoyama in Yamagata province while Naoe led another division towards the province. Kaminoyama was held by Satomi Minbu, a retainer of the Mogami clan which was aligned with Tokugawa. Honmura was killed in the fighting, but in the end the castle fell to the Uesugi forces.

References
Turnbull, Stephen (1998). 'The Samurai Sourcebook'. London: Cassell & Co.

1600 in Japan
Kaminoyama
Conflicts in 1600